Wenyuanbeilu is a metro station of Zhengzhou Metro Line 1.

Station layout  
The station has 2 floors underground. The B1 floor is for the station concourse and the B2 floor is for the platforms and tracks. The station has one island platform and two tracks for Line 1.

Exits

Surroundings
 Henan University of Animal Husbandry and Economy (河南牧业经济学院)

References 

Stations of Zhengzhou Metro
Line 1, Zhengzhou Metro
Railway stations in China opened in 2017